Liolaemus etheridgei is a species of lizard in the family  Liolaemidae. The species is native to Peru.

Etymology
The specific name, etheridgei, is in honor of American herpetologist Richard Emmett Etheridge.

Geographic range
Within Peru, L. etheridgei is found in the Regions (formerly Departments) of Arequipa and Moquegua.

Habitat

Diet
L. etheridgei preys upon insects.

Reproduction
L. etheridgei is viviparous.

References

Further reading
Laurent RF (1998). "New forms of lizards of the subgenus Eulaemus of the genus Liolaemus (Reptilia: Squamata: Tropiduridae) from Peru and northern Chile". Acta Zoológica Lilloana 44 (1): 1–26. (Liolaemus etheridgei, new species).
Llanqui I (2017). "Liolaemus etheridgei Viviparity". Herpetological Review 48 (1): 193–194.
Llanqui I (2020). "Aspects of the thermal ecology of Liolaemus etheridgei Laurent, 1998 (Reptilia: Liolaemidae) from the Andes of Peru". Herpetology Notes 13: 941–946.

etheridgei
Reptiles described in 1998
Reptiles of Peru
Taxa named by Raymond Laurent